Cochoapa el Grande  is a city and is the seat of the municipality of Cochoapa el Grande, in the state of Guerrero, south-western Mexico.

References

Populated places in Guerrero